The G protein-coupled inwardly-rectifying potassium channels (GIRKs) are a family of lipid-gated inward-rectifier potassium ion channels which are activated (opened) by the signaling lipid PIP2 and a signal transduction cascade starting with ligand-stimulated G protein-coupled receptors (GPCRs).  GPCRs in turn release activated G-protein βγ- subunits (Gβγ) from inactive heterotrimeric G protein complexes (Gαβγ).  Finally, the Gβγ dimeric protein interacts with GIRK channels to open them so that they become permeable to potassium ions, resulting in hyperpolarization of the cell membrane. G protein-coupled inwardly-rectifying potassium channels are a type of G protein-gated ion channels because of this direct interaction of G protein subunits with GIRK channels. The activation likely works by increasing the affinity of the channel for PIP2. In high concentration PIP2 activates the channel absent G-protein, but G-protein does not activate the channel absent PIP2.

GIRK1 to GIRK3 are distributed broadly in the central nervous system, where their distributions overlap. GIRK4, instead, is found primarily in the heart.

Subtypes

Examples
A wide variety of G protein-coupled receptors activate GIRKs, including the M2-muscarinic, A1-adenosine, α2-adrenergic, D2-dopamine, μ- δ-, and κ-opioid, 5-HT1A serotonin, somatostatin, galanin, m-Glu, GABAB, TAAR1, CB1 and CB2, and sphingosine-1-phosphate receptors.

Examples of GIRKs include a subset of potassium channels in the heart, which, when activated by parasympathetic signals such as acetylcholine through M2 muscarinic receptors, causes an outward current of potassium, which slows down the heart rate.  These are called muscarinic potassium channels (IKACh) and are heterotetramers composed of two GIRK1 and two GIRK4 subunits.

References

External links
 

Ion channels